Northern College may refer to:
Northern College (England), residential adult education college situated near Barnsley, United Kingdom
Northern College (Ontario), a community college in Ontario, Canada
For the former teacher training college in Scotland, see University of Aberdeen or University of Dundee.

See also
Royal Northern College of Music, Manchester, England
Northern University (disambiguation)